John Dunbar was a Home Rule League politician who served as the Member of Parliament (MP) for New Ross from February 1874 through to his death in 1878.

References

1878 deaths
Home Rule League MPs
Members of the Parliament of the United Kingdom for County Wexford constituencies (1801–1922)
Year of birth missing
UK MPs 1874–1880